was a Japanese footballer who played as a defender.

Career statistics

References

External links

1983 births
2022 deaths
Osaka University of Commerce alumni
Association football people from Hiroshima Prefecture
Japanese footballers
J1 League players
J2 League players
Cerezo Osaka players
Montedio Yamagata players
Avispa Fukuoka players
Association football defenders
People from Hiroshima Prefecture